KKIN may refer to:

 KKIN (AM), a radio station (930 AM) licensed to Aitkin, Minnesota, United States
 KKIN-FM, a radio station (94.3 FM) licensed to Aitkin, Minnesota, United States